On March 2, 2021, an SUV carrying 25 people collided with a semi-trailer truck in Imperial County, California, U.S., killing 13 people. Investigators said the SUV had entered the United States from Mexico through a hole in a border fence and was smuggling migrants at the time of the crash.

Background 
The Ford Expedition, as found at the crash site, had the middle and rear seats removed, and could only safely seat six people despite carrying 25 people.

Crash 
In the early morning of March 2, 2021, a red 1997 Ford Expedition carrying 25 passengers and originating from Mexico, having entered the United States through a hole in the border fence, was traveling westbound on Norrish Road in Imperial County, California. It entered an intersection, where a semi-trailer truck travelling north on the other road, State Route 115, crashed into the side of it, killing 13 people and injuring 13. According to authorities, the SUV ran the stop sign and drove in the path of the truck. The occupants of the SUV entered the United States in an unauthorized manner. The truck was carrying gravel cargo, and was owned by a company called Haven & Sons.

Aftermath 
The accident closed all lanes in both directions of SR-115.  The National Transportation Safety Board announced an investigation into the crash. Authorities in California are working with the Mexican consulate to determine who was in the vehicle and to notify next of kin. The US Department of Homeland Security believes that it was part of an illegal migrant smuggling operation.

References

2021 disasters in the United States
2021 in California
2021 road incidents
2020s crimes in California
2020s road incidents in North America
Car crash
March 2021 crimes in the United States
Road incidents in the United States
Transportation disasters in California